Following is a list of senators of Loire, people who have represented the department of Loire in the Senate of France.

Third Republic

Senators for Loire under the French Third Republic were:

 Lucien Arbel (1876–1888)
 Pierre de Montgolfier-Verpilleux (1876–1879)
 Camille de Meaux (1876–1879)
 Jean-Baptiste Chavassieu (1879–1888)
 Charles Cherpin (1879–1884)
 Étienne Brossard (1885–1894)
 Pierre Madignier (1887–1894)
 Barthélémy Brunon (1888–1896)
 Francisque Reymond (1888–1905)
 Albert Marchais de la Berge (1891–1894)
 Jean-Honoré Audiffred (1894–1895 et de 1904–1917)
 Pierre Waldeck-Rousseau (1894–1904)
 Philippe Blanc (1895–1906)
 Pierre Bourganel (1895–1920)
 Émile Crozet-Fourneyron (1897–1906)
 Émile Reymond (1905–1914)
 André Chollet (1906–1911)
 Gabriel Réal (1906–1919)
 Jean-Baptiste Morel (1912–1927)
 Louis Maurin (1920–1924)
 Fernand Merlin (1920–1937)
 Louis Soulié (1920–1933)
 Antoine Drivet (1920–1940)
 François Delay (1924–1933)
 Pierre Robert (1927–1940)
 Jean Neyret (1933–1940)
 Jean Taurines (1933–1940)
 Antoine Pinay (1938–1940)

Fourth Republic

Senators for Loire under the French Fourth Republic were:

 Jules Boyer (1946–1948)
 Barthélémy Ott (1946–1948)
 Claudius Buard (1946–1948)
 Max Fléchet (1948–1959)
 Alexandre de Fraissinette (1948–1955)
 Aimé Malécot (1948–1955)
 Louis Metton (1955–1959)
 Claude Mont (1955–1959)

Fifth Republic 
Senators for Loire under the French Fifth Republic:

References

Sources

 
Lists of members of the Senate (France) by department